Klaus Tschütscher (born 8 July 1967) is a Liechtensteiner politician who served as the twelfth Prime Minister of Liechtenstein from 25 March 2009 until being succeeded in this capacity on 27 March 2013. His Ministries were General Government Affairs, Finance, Family Affairs and Gender equality. Tschütscher belongs to the Patriotic Union-party.

Klaus Tschütscher is married to Arzu Tschütscher-Alanyurt, a Turkish Austrian, and father of two children and lives in Ruggell.

Background and politics 
At first Klaus Tschütscher was in primary and secondary school at Liechtenstein's capital, Vaduz. Afterwards he studied law at the University of St. Gallen from 1987 to 1993 and completed his Doctor of law degree (Dr. iur.) in 1996. Meanwhile, he worked at the university as a research associate for two years (until 1995). After that he became head of the administrative department for legal services and economy at the Liechtenstein fiscal authority. Two months later he additionally became deputy director of the fiscal authority. From 1998 to 2005 Tschütscher taught avocationally as a part-time lecturer at the University of Liechtenstein. 2002 to 2005 he graduated once again in a Master of Law-postgraduate study on International Business Law at the University of Zurich.

In the 2005 parliament elections the leading Progressive Citizens' Party lost the absolute majority and was therefore forced to build a coalition government with the Patriotic Union. Tschütscher became Deputy Prime Minister in the Government of Otmar Hasler. In this position his Ministries were Justice, Economic Affairs and Sports. In 2009 the elections led to a victory of the Patriotic Union. As Otmar Hasler afterwards handed in his resignation, Klaus Tschütscher became Head of Government as Prime Minister of Liechtenstein on 25 March 2009. Tschütscher did not stand for reelection in the 2013 Liechtenstein parliamentary election and was replaced as Prime Minister by Adrian Hasler.

Honours
  : Grand Decoration of Honour in Gold with Sash for Services to the Republic of Austria (2011)

References

External links 

1967 births
Heads of government of Liechtenstein
Deputy Prime Ministers of Liechtenstein
Living people
Patriotic Union (Liechtenstein) politicians
University of St. Gallen alumni